The Portugal women's national handball team is the national team of Portugal. It is governed by the Portuguese Handball Federation and takes part in international team handball competitions.

European Championship record
2008 – 16th

References

External links

IHF profile

National team
Women's national handball teams
Women's national sports teams of Portugal